Neoascia subchalybea is a species of Hoverfly in the family Syrphidae.

Distribution
Canada, United States.

References

Eristalinae
Insects described in 1925
Diptera of North America
Taxa named by Charles Howard Curran